Kosenkov is a Russian masculine surname, its feminine counterpart is Kosenkova. It may refer to

 Aleksandr Kosenkov (born 1956), Belarusian diver
 Alexander Kosenkow (born 1977), German sprinter of Russian descent
Yuliya Kosenkova (born 1973), Russian middle-distance runner

See also
 Kosenko

References

Russian-language surnames